Podocarpus totara (from the Maori-language ; the spelling "totara" is also common in English) is a species of podocarp tree endemic to New Zealand. It grows throughout the North Island and northeastern South Island in lowland, montane and lower subalpine forest at elevations of up to 600 m.

Tōtara is commonly found in lowland areas where the soil is fertile and well drained.

Description
The tōtara is a medium to large tree, which grows slowly to around 20 to 25 m, exceptionally to 35 m; it is noted for its longevity and the great girth of its trunk. The bark peels off in papery flakes, with a purplish to golden brown hue. The sharp, dull-green, needle-like leaves are stiff and leathery, 2 cm long. This plant produces highly modified cones with two to four fused, fleshy, berry-like, juicy scales, bright red when mature. The cone contains one or two rounded seeds at the apex of the scales.

The largest known living tōtara, the Pouakani Tree, near Pureora in the central North Island, is over 35 m tall and nearly 4 m in trunk diameter at breast height. Bushmen discovered it in 1950. Other large trees are known in this area, while Whirinaki Forest, to the east, but also on deep recent volcanic soils, has groves of very tall tōtara (over 40 m in height).

Tōtara is often found regenerating on farmland, as it is not eaten by livestock.

Varieties 
The two varieties of tōtara are:

 P. t. var. totara
 P. t. var. waihoensis

Related trees
In a classic example of Antarctic flora species-pair the tōtara is very closely related to Podocarpus nubigenus from South America, to the extent that if planted together, they are very difficult to distinguish. The best distinction is the grey-green tone of the leaves, compared to the slightly brighter green of P. nubigenus.

Cultivation

Tōtara grows easily from fresh seed and cuttings.  It has been planted in the United Kingdom as far north as Inverewe, Scotland.

Several cultivars for garden use have been introduced. These include 'Albany Gold' and 'Aurea', both have yellow 'gold' foliage that darkens in winter; 'Pendula', which has a weeping growth habit that is especially pronounced in young plants; 'Silver Falls', also pendulous but with cream-edged foliage; and 'Matapouri Blue', which has a conical form and glaucous foliage.

Human use
The wood is hard, straight-grained, and very resistant to rot, especially its heartwood. Due to its durability, tōtara wood was often used for fence posts, floor pilings, and railway sleepers. It is also prized for its carving properties, and was the primary wood used in Māori carving. It was the primary wood used to make waka in traditional Maori boat building due to its relatively light weight (about 25% lighter than kauri), long, straight lengths, and natural oils in the wood that help prevent rotting. Tōtara could be drilled with chert points to make holes near the edges of the timber without splitting. In larger tōtara waka, three or more sections were laced together with flax rope. A tōtara waka took at least a year to make using stone adzes.

Bark from tōtara is used to cover and protect traditional pōhā bags.

Gallery

References

External links 
 .
 New Zealand Plant Conservation Network, URL:Podocarpus totara var. totara. Accessed 2010-10-03.
 New Zealand Plant Conservation Network, URL:Podocarpus totara var. waihoensis. Accessed 2010-10-03.

totara
Trees of New Zealand
Endemic flora of New Zealand